Seoul Metropolitan City Route 60 is an urban road located in Seoul, South Korea.

Stopovers
 Seoul
 Guro District - Yeongdeungpo District - Mapo District - Seodaemun District - Jung District - Seongdong District - Gwangjin District - Songpa District - Gangdong District

List of Facilities 

IS: Intersection, IC: Interchange
 (■): Motorway section

References

Roads in Seoul